Sensei, Seonsaeng, Tiên sinh or Hsien sheng/Xiansheng, corresponding to Chinese characters , is an East Asian honorific term shared in Japanese, Korean, Vietnamese and Chinese; it is literally translated as "person born before another" or "one who comes before". In general usage, it is used, with proper form, after a person's name and means "teacher"; the word is also used as a title to refer to or address other professionals or people of authority, such as clergy, accountants, lawyers, physicians and politicians or to show respect to someone who has achieved a certain level of mastery in an art form or some other skill, e.g., accomplished novelists, musicians, artists and martial artists.

Etymology
The two characters that make up the term can be directly translated as "born before" and imply one who teaches based on wisdom from age and experience.

The word prefaced by the adjective 大, pronounced "dai" (or "ō"), which means "great" or "large", is often translated "grand master". This compound term, "dai-sensei" (大先生), is sometimes used to refer to the top sensei in a particular school or tradition, particularly within the iemoto system. For a more senior member of a group who has not achieved the level of sensei, the term  is used – note the common use of 先 "before"; in martial arts, this is particularly used for the most senior non-sensei member.

The Japanese expression of 'sensei' shares the same characters as the Chinese word 先生, pronounced xiānshēng in Standard Chinese. Xiansheng was a courtesy title for a man of respected stature. Middle Chinese pronunciation of this term may have been * or *. In modern Standard Chinese, it is used in the same way as the title "Mr". Prior to the development of the modern vernacular, xiānshēng was used to address teachers of both genders; this has fallen out of usage in Standard Chinese, though it is retained in some southern Chinese Chinese varieties such as Cantonese, Hokkien, Wu, Teochew and Hakka, where it still has the meaning "teacher" or "doctor". In Japanese, sensei is still used to address people of both genders. It is likely both the current Southern Chinese and Japanese usages are more reflective of its Middle Chinese etymology. For Hokkien and Teochew communities in Singapore and Malaysia, "Sensei" is the proper word to address school teachers. Malays in Singapore traditionally addressed Chinese physicians as "Sensei" too.

Use in Buddhism 
In Sanbo Kyodan related zen schools, sensei is  used to refer to ordained teachers below the rank of rōshi. However, other schools of Buddhism in Japan use the term for any priest regardless of seniority; for example, this title is also used for Jōdo Shinshū ministers in the United States, whether they are ethnic Japanese or not. In the Kwan Um School of Zen, according to Zen master Seungsahn, the Korean title ji do poep sa nim is much like the Japanese title "sensei".

In Nichiren Buddhism, members of the Soka Gakkai International refer to the president of the sangha, currently Daisaku Ikeda, as Sensei.

See also
 Japanese martial arts titles
 Chinese: shifu
 Sanskrit: guru
 Zen ranks and hierarchy
 Senpai
 Rōshi

References

External links

 What is a Sensei in Judo?
 Karate: What is a Sensei in Karate? 

Japanese honorifics
Titles and rank in Japanese martial arts
Zen
Japanese Buddhist titles
Japanese words and phrases
Japanese values